Thomas William Andrews (19 October 1900 – 21 November 1974) was an Australian politician. Born in Kalino, Victoria, he was educated at state schools in Ballarat. From 1917-49 he was a teacher in state schools, as well as an official with the Teachers' Union. He sat on Preston City Council and was a member of the 1947 Royal Commission on Victorian Education. In 1949, he was elected to the Australian House of Representatives as the Labor member for Darebin. 

In 1955, Andrews was expelled from the Labor Party and, together with six other MPs, formed the Australian Labor Party (Anti-Communist), precursor to the Democratic Labor Party. He went on to lose the seat of Darebin at the subsequent federal election, held the same year. 

Andrews would go on to contest the division of Darebin and its successor Scullin for the Democratic Labor Party at every Federal election between 1958 and 1972. Andrews died in 1974.

References

Australian Labor Party members of the Parliament of Australia
Democratic Labour Party members of the Parliament of Australia
Members of the Australian House of Representatives for Darebin
Members of the Australian House of Representatives
Australian trade unionists
1900 births
1974 deaths
20th-century Australian politicians
People from Ballarat